Parima Tapirapecó National Park (Parque Nacional Parima Tapirapecó) is a Venezuelan national park in the southern state of Amazonas.

Location

The Parima Tapirapecó National Park is in the Atabapo and Río Negro municipalities.  It is the 5th largest national park in the world and the 2nd largest in South America.
Established in August 1991, it has an area of 38,290 km2 (15,000 mile²), and is the largest national park in Venezuela. The area protects the headwaters of the Orinoco, likewise the natural space and culture of the Yanomami ethnic group.

Environment

The park is in the Guayanan Highlands moist forests ecoregion.
"The main types of vegetation in Parima-Tapirapecó National Park are evergreen lowland forests and submontane and montane forests. There are also large areas of mostly secondary savannas in the southern Parima uplands."

See also
List of national parks of Venezuela
Serra do Aracá State Park

References

National parks of Venezuela
Guayana Highlands
Geography of Amazonas (Venezuelan state)
Protected areas established in 1991
1991 establishments in Venezuela
Tourist attractions in Amazonas (Venezuelan state)